The bar-tailed treecreeper (Certhia himalayana), or the Himalayan treecreeper is a species of bird in the family Certhiidae.  It is found primarily in the northern parts of the Indian subcontinent, particularly in the Himalayas, as well as in adjoining regions.  It is found in Afghanistan, India, Iran, Kazakhstan, Myanmar, Nepal, Tibet, Russia, Tajikistan, Turkmenistan, and Uzbekistan.
Its natural habitats are boreal forests and temperate forests.

Description

The bar-tailed treecreeper has a flecked or striped feather pattern, usually in black, brown, white and red hues. This coloration allows the treecreeper to blend in with its forest surroundings quite well.

References

bar-tailed treecreeper
Birds of Central Asia
Birds of Afghanistan
Birds of Pakistan
Birds of North India
Birds of Nepal
Birds of Central China
Birds of Yunnan
Birds of Myanmar
bar-tailed treecreeper
Taxonomy articles created by Polbot